Ófalu is a village in Pécsvárad District of Baranya County in Hungary. The name literally means "old village".

Populated places in Baranya County